James de Barry, 4th Viscount Buttevant and 17th Baron Barry (1520–1581) was an Irish magnate. He joined the rebels in the Desmond Rebellion and died in captivity at Dublin Castle.

Birth and origins 
James was born in 1520, probably at Rathbarry in Barryroe barony, eldest son of Richard de Barry and Isabel FitzGerald. His father was a son of James de Barry, Lord of Ibane, and his wife Elane MacCarthy of Muskerry. James's full name, inclusive of the patronymic, therefore was James FitzRichard de Barry.

His mother was a daughter of Sir James FitzGerald of Leixlip, a younger son of Gerald FitzGerald, 8th Earl of Kildare.

Marriage and children 
Before 1550 Barry married Ellen (also called Ilene), an illegitimate daughter of Cormac na Haoine MacCarthy Reagh, 13th Prince of Carbery. This was a very good marriage for him, as a member of a cadet branch of the Barry dynasty.

 
James and Ellen had five sons:
 Richard (died 1622), born deaf and dumb, was passed over in the succession and died unmarried.
 David (1550–1617), the second son, succeeded as the 5th Viscount
 William Barry, of Lislee.
 Edmund Barry, married Eleanora, daughter of James Butler, Baron Dunboyne. 
 John Barry (died 1627)

—and five daughters, of which four are known by name:
 Joan, married David Roche, 7th Viscount Fermoy
 Honora, married Patrick Condon
 Eleanor, married Sir Owen O'Sullivan, knight
 Ilane, married Callaghan MacTeighe MacCarthy of Muskerry

Viscount Buttevant, later life, and death 
His predecessor in the viscountcy, James Fitz John Barry, died childless in 1558. Barry was his cousin but not his heir, but he seized the land and usurped the title.

In 1567 Buttevant was knighted in Limerick by the Henry Sidney, the Lord Deputy.

In 1570 Buttevant received a lease, to hold for twenty-one years, of "the site of the house of the friars at Killnamullagh, alias Buttevante, County Cork, with its appurtenances at an annual rent of 16 shillings and 8 pence".

In 1575 Barry received a pardon. 

In 1579 at the outbreak of the second Desmond Rebellion, Buttevant as well as David, his son and successor, joined the rebels. Buttevant was arrested in July 1680 and detained at Dublin Castle where he died on 10 April 1581.

In the subsequent confiscations of his estates, the Buttevant Franciscan Friary, together with its glebe, passed into the hands of the poet, Edmund Spenser.

Notes and references

Notes

Citations

Sources 

 
 
  – Ab-Adam to Basing (for Barry)
 
 
 
  – Knights bachelors & Index

1520 births
1581 deaths
16th-century Irish people
James
MacCarthy dynasty
People of Elizabethan Ireland
Viscounts in the Peerage of Ireland